Cəngənəvud (also, Cəncinəvud, Dzhanganavud, and Dzhangonavut) is a village and municipality in the Lerik Rayon of Azerbaijan.  It has a population of 311.

References 

Populated places in Lerik District